The 1990 Kilkenny Senior Hurling Championship was the 96th staging of the Kilkenny Senior Hurling Championship since its establishment by the Kilkenny County Board in 1887. The championship began on 28 April 1990 and ended on 7 October 1990.

Ballyhale Shamrocks were the defending champions, however, they were defeated by Fenians at the quarter-final stage.

On 15 September 1990, Conahy Shamrocks were relegated from the championship following 4-10 to 1-09 defeat by Graigue-Ballycallan.

On 7 October 1990, Glenmore won the championship after a 3-15 to 2-06 defeat of Clara in the final. It was their second championship title overall and their first title in three championship seasons.

Clara's Anthony Prendergast was the championship's top scorer with 5-48.

Results

Group stage

Group 1 table

Group 1 results

Group 2 table

Group 2 results

Relegation play-offs

Quarter-finals

Semi-finals

Final

References

Kilkenny Senior Hurling Championship
Kilkenny Senior Hurling Championship